Mwamikazi Nidi Ririkumutima Bizima Bitazimiza Mwezi (died 28 July 1917) was Queen Regent of Burundi from 1908 to her death.

Early life and family
Ririkumutima was born in the mid-nineteenth century in the Kingdom of Burundi, the third daughter of Chief Sekawonyi of the Watussi Munyakarama clan by his wife Inankinso. One of thirteen wives of Mwezi Gisabo (ca. 1850 – 1908), king of Burundi, Ririkumutima gave birth to three daughters and six sons.

Political career
The elderly king Mwezi died in 1908. Ririkumutima was anxious to secure that the royal succession would pass to one of her sons. Aware that another wife, Ntibahinya, was gaining favour and that the throne seemed likely to pass to Ntibahinya's son, Mbikije, Ririkumutima arranged for Ntibahinya's assassination. She then proclaimed throughout the kingdom that she was Mbukije's mother and therefore the rightful queen mother. While it was widely known that Ririkumutima was not Mbukije's biological mother, the fiction was accepted and she served as regent both during Mbukije's reign as Mutaga IV Mbikije and the following reign of Mwambutsa IV.

The role of queen mother (mugabekazi) was a highly revered one in Burundian society; this, coupled with Ririkumutima's political acumen made her a formidable presence. Her other sons became important chiefs in the local aristocracy.

Relation to European colonial government
Though Burundi had become a German colony as part of German East Africa in 1890, the colonial power did not effectively occupy or control the region. In 1916 during World War I, the Belgian troops invaded and occupied the region.

The first Europeans to encounter Ririkumutima described her as being:

Death
Ririkumutima died at Gitega on 28 July 1917.

References

1917 deaths
Burundian politicians
Burundian women in politics
Burundian religious leaders
Year of birth missing